Knoroz is an East Slavic surname. Notable people with the surname include:

 Anna Knoroz (born 1970), Russian hurdler
 Polina Knoroz (born 1999), Russian pole vaulter

See also
 

Russian-language surnames
Ukrainian-language surnames